HC Spartak Moscow is a professional ice hockey team based in Moscow, Russia. They played in the Tarasov Division of the Kontinental Hockey League during the 2013–14 season. However, the team did not participate in the KHL league for the 2014–15 season because of financial issues, but rejoined the league prior to the 2015–16 season as members of the Bobrov Division.

History
One of the sections of the Spartak Moscow sports club, HC Spartak Moscow was established in 1946. They have won the Soviet Championship four times, and have also had European-level success in the Spengler Cup, which they have won five times.

The financial state of the team became worse and worse since the beginning of 2006. After the season, a Russian businessman and huge Spartak fan, Vadim Melkov, volunteered to find suitable sponsorship for his favorite team. After negotiations, the Government of Moscow agreed to cover all of team debts. Some preliminary agreements about team sale were  achieved as well. However, Melkov died during the S7 Airlines plane crash of July 9, 2006. All the deal proposals were cancelled. After a month of struggling to improve the financial situation, it was decided by Spartak management to disband the team for a year.

Honours

Domestic competitions
 Soviet League Championship (4): 1961–62, 1966–67, 1968–69, 1975–76

 USSR Cup (2): 1970, 1971

 Vysshaya Liga Championship (1): 2001

Europe
 European Cup (2): 1969–70, 1976–77

 Spengler Cup (5): 1980, 1981, 1985, 1989, 1990

 Ahearne Cup (3): 1971, 1972, 1973

 Mountfield Cup (1): 2019

Season-by-season KHL record

Note: GP = Games played, W = Wins, L = Losses, T = Ties, OTL = Overtime/shootout losses, Pts = Points, GF = Goals for, GA = Goals against

Players

Current roster

NHL alumni

 Nikolai Borschevsky (1989–92, 1994–95, 1996–98)
 Vitali Prokhorov (1983–92, 1994–95, 1997–98)
 Alexander Selivanov (1988–94)
 Danny Markov (1993–97)
 Pavel Bure (1994–95)
 Ilya Kovalchuk (1999–2001)
 Oleg Petrov (2012–13)
 Vyacheslav Kozlov (2012–14)
 Martin Cibák(2009–11)
 Štefan Ružička (2008–13)
 Branko Radivojevič (2008–11, 2012–13)
 Tom Wandell (2013–14)
 Deron Quint (2013–14)
 Matt Anderson (2013–14)
 Dominik Hašek (2010–11)

Franchise KHL scoring leaders 

These are the top-ten point-scorers in franchise history. Figures are updated after each completed KHL regular season.

Note: Pos = Position; GP = Games played; G = Goals; A = Assists; Pts = Points; P/G = Points per game;  = current Spartak player

References

External links
  

 
Ice hockey teams in Russia
Ice hockey clubs established in 1946
Kontinental Hockey League teams
Spartak Moscow
Bobrov Division (KHL)